Gaël Danic (born 19 November 1981) is a French retired professional footballer who plays as a midfielder.

Club career
Danic played for Stade Rennais F.C. at senior Level, before moving to En Avant de Guingamp, and after that Grenoble, where he spent two years. He spent three years at Troyes AC although one of them he was loaned out to FC Lorient. He spent five years at Valenciennes FC where he played 101 games getting 15 goals.

On 1 July 2013, Olympique Lyonnais announced Danic had signed on a two-year contract and for a transfer fee of €800,000 transfer plus a possible €200,000 in bonuses.

In January 2015, after being released from his contract in Lyon, Danic signed an eighteen-month contract with SC Bastia.

International career
Danic played five matches for the France U20s in the 2001 FIFA World Youth Championship.

References

External links
 
 

1981 births
Living people
Sportspeople from Vannes
Association football midfielders
French footballers
France youth international footballers
Stade Rennais F.C. players
En Avant Guingamp players
Grenoble Foot 38 players
ES Troyes AC players
FC Lorient players
Valenciennes FC players
Olympique Lyonnais players
SC Bastia players
Stade Lavallois players
US Saint-Malo players
Ligue 1 players
Ligue 2 players
Championnat National players
Championnat National 2 players
Footballers from Brittany